Jurak-e Nasibollah (also Romanized as Jūrak-e Naṣībollah; also known as Jorak-e Bālā) is a village in Poshteh-ye Zilayi Rural District, Sarfaryab District, Charam County, Kohgiluyeh and Boyer-Ahmad Province, Iran. At the 2006 census, its population was 99, in 20 families.

References 

Populated places in Charam County